Woman in the Moon (German Frau im Mond) is a German science fiction silent film that premiered 15 October 1929 at the UFA-Palast am Zoo cinema in Berlin to an audience of 2,000.  It is often considered to be one of the first "serious" science fiction films. It was directed by Fritz Lang, and written by his wife Thea von Harbou, based on her 1928 novel The Rocket to the Moon. It was released in the US as By Rocket to the Moon and in the UK as Girl in the Moon. The basics of rocket travel were presented to a mass audience for the first time by this film, including the use of a multi-stage rocket. The film was shot between October 1928 and June 1929 at the UFA studios in Neubabelsberg near Berlin.

Plot
Helius (Willy Fritsch) is an entrepreneur with an interest in space travel. He seeks out his friend Professor Mannfeldt (Klaus Pohl), a visionary who wrote a treatise claiming that there was probably much gold on the Moon, only to be ridiculed by his peers. Helius recognizes the value of Mannfeldt's work. However, a gang of evil businessmen have also taken an interest in Mannfeldt's theories, and send a spy (Fritz Rasp) who identifies himself as "Walter Turner".

Meanwhile, Helius's assistant Windegger (Gustav von Wangenheim) has announced his engagement to Helius's other assistant, Friede (Gerda Maurus). Helius, who secretly loves Friede, avoids their engagement party.

On his way home from his meeting with Professor Mannfeldt, Helius is mugged by henchmen of the gang. They steal the research that Professor Mannfeldt had entrusted to Helius, and also burgle Helius's home, taking other valuable material. Turner then presents Helius with an ultimatum: the gang know he is planning a voyage to the Moon; either he includes them in the project, or they will sabotage it and destroy his rocket, which is named Friede ("peace"). Reluctantly, Helius agrees to their terms.

The rocket team is assembled: Helius; Professor Mannfeldt and his pet mouse Josephine; Windegger; Friede; and Turner. After Friede blasts off, the team discovers that Gustav (Gustl Gstettenbaur), a young boy who has befriended Helius, has stowed away, along with his collection of science fiction pulp magazines.

During the journey, Windegger emerges as a coward, and Helius's feelings for Friede begin to become known to her, creating a romantic triangle.

They reach the far side of the Moon and find it has a breathable atmosphere, per the theories of Peter Andreas Hansen, who is mentioned near the beginning of the film. Mannfeldt discovers gold, proving his theory. When confronted by Turner, Mannfeldt falls to his death in a crevasse. Turner attempts to hijack the rocket, and in the struggle, he is shot and killed. Gunfire damages the oxygen tanks, and they come to the grim realization that there is not enough oxygen for all to make the return trip. One person must remain on the Moon.

Helius and Windegger draw straws to see who must stay and Windegger loses. Seeing Windegger's anguish, Helius decides to drug Windegger and Friede with a last drink together and take Windegger's place, letting Windegger return to Earth with Friede. Friede senses that something is in the wine. She pretends to drink and then retires to the compartment where her cot is located, closes and locks the door. Windegger drinks the wine, becoming sedated. Helius makes Gustav his confidant and the new pilot for the ship. Helius watches it depart, then starts out for the survival camp originally prepared for Windegger. He discovers that Friede has decided to stay with him on the Moon. They embrace, and Helius weeps into her shoulder while Friede strokes his hair and whispers words of comfort to him.

Influence

Lang, who also made Metropolis, had a personal interest in science fiction. When returning to Germany in the late 1950s, he sold his extensive collection of Astounding Science Fiction, Weird Tales, and Galaxy magazines. Several prescient technical/operational features are presented during the film's 1920s launch sequence, which subsequently came into common operational use during America's postwar space race:
 The rocket ship Friede is fully built in a tall building and moved to the launch area
 As launch approaches, intertitles count down the seconds from six to "now" ("now" was used for zero), and Woman in the Moon is often cited as the first occurrence of the "countdown to zero" before a rocket launch
 The rocket ship blasts off submerged in a pool of water; water is commonly used today on launch pads to absorb and dissipate the extreme heat and to damp the noise generated by the rocket exhaust
 In space, the rocket ejects its first stage and fires its second stage rocket, predicting the development of modern multistage orbital rockets
 The crew recline on horizontal beds to cope with the G-forces experienced during lift-off and pre-orbital acceleration
 Floor foot straps are used to restrain the crew during zero gravity (Velcro is used today).

These items and the overall design of the rocket led to the film being banned in Germany from 1933–1945 during World War II by the Nazis, due to similarities to their secret V-2 project.

Rocket scientist Hermann Oberth worked as an advisor on this movie. He had originally intended to build a working rocket for use in the film, but time and technology prevented this from happening. The film was popular among the rocket scientists in Wernher von Braun's circle at the Verein für Raumschiffahrt (VfR). The first successfully launched V-2 rocket at the rocket-development facility in Peenemünde had the Frau im Mond logo painted on its base. Noted post-war science writer Willy Ley also served as a consultant on the film. Thomas Pynchon's 1973 novel Gravity's Rainbow, which deals with the V-2 rockets, refers to the movie, along with several other classic German silent films.
Oberth also advised Hergé for Destination Moon and Explorers on the Moon (1953/4), which has plot points strongly influenced by Woman in the Moon.

Cast
 Klaus Pohl as Professor Georg Manfeldt
 Willy Fritsch as Wolf Helius
 Gustav von Wangenheim as Ingenieur Hans Windegger (as Gustav v. Wangenheim)
 Gerda Maurus as Stud. astr. Friede Velten
 Gustl Gstettenbaur as Gustav (as Gustl Stark-Gstettenbaur)
 Fritz Rasp as Der Mann "who calls himself Walter Turner"
 Tilla Durieux as Fünf Gehirne und Scheckbücher
 Hermann Vallentin as Fünf Gehirne und Scheckbücher
 Max Zilzer as Fünf Gehirne und Scheckbücher
 Mahmud Terja Bey  as  Fünf Gehirne und Scheckbücher
 Borwin Walth as Fünf Gehirne und Scheckbücher
 Karl Platen as Der Mann am Mikrophon
 Margarete Kupfer as Frau Hippolt, Haushälterin bei Helius
 Alexa von Porembsky as Eine Veilchenverkäuferin (as Alexa v. Porembska)
 Gerhard Dammann as Der Werkmeister der Helius-Flugwerften (as Dammann)
 Heinrich Gotho as Der Mieter vom II. Stock (as Gotho)
 Alfred Loretto as Zwei eindeutige Existenzen (as Loretto)
 Max Maximilian as Grotjan, Chauffeur bei Helius (as Maximilian)
 Edgar Pauly as Zwei eindeutige Existenzen (as Pauly)
 Die Maus Josephine as Maus

See also 
 1929 in science fiction

References

Further reading
 Kraszna-Krausz, A. (2004). "Frau in Mond (The Woman in the Moon)". In Rickman, Gregg. The Science Fiction Film Reader. Limelight Editions. pp. 20–21. .

External links
 
 
 
 
 

1929 films
German silent feature films
German science fiction films
1920s science fiction films
Moon in film
Films about astronauts
Films directed by Fritz Lang
Films based on science fiction novels
Films based on German novels
Films based on works by Thea von Harbou
German black-and-white films
Films of the Weimar Republic
Babelsberg Studio films
Films with screenplays by Fritz Lang
Films with screenplays by Thea von Harbou
UFA GmbH films
1920s German films
1920s German-language films
Silent science fiction films